The Savoia-Marchetti SM.81 Pipistrello (Italian: bat) was the first three-engine bomber/transport aircraft serving in the Italian Regia Aeronautica. When it appeared in 1935, it represented a real step ahead in Italian military aviation: it was fast, well armed and had a long range. It proved effective during the war with Ethiopia and the Spanish Civil War. Despite being too slow to remain competitive as a bomber in the later years of World War II, it was one of the most flexible, reliable and important aircraft of the Regia Aeronautica from 1935 to 1944, and adapted to second-line duties in a wide range of tasks.

Design and development
The SM.81 was a militarised version of Savoia-Marchetti's earlier SM.73 airliner, having cantilever wings, three engines and a fixed undercarriage. The origins of this version were in pursuit of the interests of Italo Balbo, a brilliant exponent of the Fascist regime (but nevertheless "exiled" in Libya by Mussolini), who required a fast and efficient aircraft that was capable of serving the vast Italian colonies in Africa.

The SM.81 had wings that were roughly similar to those of the double-fuselage S.55, and identical to those of the S.73, but had a much simpler fuselage. Around six months after the SM.73s first appearance, the SM.81 prototype (MM.20099) first flew from Vergiate, near Varese, on 8 February 1934, controlled by test pilot Adriano Bacula. The first serie, ordered in 1935, was for 100 aircraft and was quickly put into production as a result of the international crisis and the embargo caused by the war in Ethiopia. The first examples were sent to 7 Wing at Campo della Promessa airbase near Lonate Pozzolo.

Although it was quickly superseded as a front-line bomber, the SM.81 continued to serve as a transport by virtue of its wide fuselage, which allowed it to accommodate a wide range of loads. Apart from its speed, it was generally superior to the SM.79 Sparviero as a multirole aircraft.

Overall characteristics
The SM.81 was a robust, three-engine monoplane, with a fixed tailwheel undercarriage, with the mainwheels enclosed by large spats to reduce drag, and had a crew of six. The aircraft was of mixed construction: the fuselage had a framework of steel tubes with a metallic-covered aft portion, while the rest was wood- and fabric-covered. It had a relatively large fuselage, an unnecessary characteristic for a bomber, which determined its future as a transport aircraft. Since the engines were quite small, the fuselage did not blend well with the nose engine, even less so than the SM.79. Many windows were present to provide the fuselage interior with daylight, giving the impression that it was a passenger aircraft.

The all-wooden wings had three spars to provide the necessary support, whereas the semi-elliptical tail surfaces were fabric-covered metal. The pilot and co-pilot were seated side-by-side in an enclosed cockpit, with separate cabins for the flight engineer and the radio-operator/gunner behind the cockpit. The bomb bay was behind the cockpit, together with a passage which linked the mid and aft fuselage, where there were three further defensive positions.

The bombardier's position was located just below the cockpit, in a semi-retractable gondola, and differed from that of the SM.79, being both larger and in a location which was more favourable for communicating with the crew, and provided excellent visibility thanks to the glazed panel. Both this position and the cockpit had escape hatches, but for normal entry and exit there was a door in the left, mid-fuselage, and one in the aft fuselage. Equipment included an RA 350I radio-transmitter, AR5 radio-receiver, and a P63N radiocompass (not always fitted), while other systems comprised an electrical generator, fire extinguishing system, and an OMI 30 camera (in the gunner's nacelle).

The aircraft, having a large wing and robust undercarriage, was reliable and pleasant to fly, and could operate from all types of terrain. It was surprisingly fast for its time and, given the power of its engines, especially compared to the similar Junkers Ju 52. It was better armed than the SM.79, but the increased drag combined with the same engine power reduced the maximum speed and cruise speeds as well as the range. No armour was fitted, except for the self-sealing fuel tanks.

Armament
The SM.81 was equipped with six machine guns providing a heavy defensive armament for a 1935 aircraft. Two powered retractable turrets, one dorsal (just behind the pilots' seats) and one ventral-aft, were each fitted with 7.7 mm (0.303 in) Breda-SAFAT machine guns, while single 7.7 mm (.303 in) Lewis Guns were mounted to fire through lateral hatches. The turrets were rotated by a "Riva-Calzoni" hydraulic system, while the guns' elevation was manual, and manual back-up mechanisms were provided for both the retracting and rotating systems. Once retracted, only the upper part of the turret was visible, with the gun barrels positioned vertically, one aft of the other to reduce drag, giving the impression that the aircraft had additional antennae. Given the SM.81's cruise speed of around 270 km/h (170 mph) and the presence of a massive fixed undercarriage, the aerodynamic gain was relatively small.

The ventral turret was operated in a different fashion to those fitted to other aircraft where the gunner occupied the ball- or dustbin-shaped structure; instead, due to lack of space, the gunner crouched in the fuselage with his head down inside the turret. This proved not to be very effective as were most ventral turrets, and they were not fitted to further Savoias, although Piaggio fitted a dustbin-style turret accommodating the gunner to their P.108.

Both flanks were covered by one single and one twin gun installation. Initially six 7.7 mm (.303 in) Vickers machine guns were fitted, but these were later replaced by reliable, if not very fast-firing models made by Breda, together with 500 rounds per gun.

The SM.81's bomb bay was divided into two parts with a passage linking aft and mid fuselage between, and could accommodate a wide range of ordnance up to a total of 2,000 kg (4,410 lb) over short ranges, with individual bombs of up to 500 kg (1,100 lb), arranged either horizontally or vertically:

4 × 500 kg (1,100 lb) (stored horizontally)
4 × 250 kg (550 lb) (ditto)
16 × 100 kg (220 lb) (stored vertically, as all the smaller ones), true weight around 130 kg (287 lb)
28 × 50 kg (110 lb) (true weight, around 70 kg/150 lb)
56 × 31 kg (68 lb), 24 kg (53 lb), 20 kg (40 lb), or 15 kg (33 lb)
1,008 × 2 kg (4 lb) (true weight, around 1,700 kg/3,750 lb)
Incendiary bombs

The bomb-release mechanism was located on the right side of the bombardier's position.

The SM.81's defensive armament was better than its successor, the SM.79, and even than that of the SM.84, although of smaller calibre, but still insufficient when faced with modern enemy fighter opposition. It was also capable of carrying a greater bombload than the SM.79, due to its wide fuselage.

Propulsion

The SM.81 had a three-engine configuration, but unlike the Sparviero, was fitted with a wide range of engines throughout its production:
Alfa Romeo 125 RC.35, 432–507 kW (580–680 hp). 192 built.
Gnome-Rhône 14K, 485–746 kW (650-1,000 hp).96 built.
Piaggio P.X R.C.15, 501–522 kW (670–700 hp) – 48 built.
Piaggio P.IX R.C.40, 507 kW (680 hp) – 140 built.
Alfa Romeo 126 RC.34, 582–671 kW (780–900 hp), also fitted to early versions of the SM.79. 58 built.

In addition, one aircraft, the SM.81B, was built in a twin-engined configuration, powered by two 627 kW (840 hp) Isotta-Fraschini Asso XI inline engines and a streamlined, glazed nose. It had inferior performance to the three-engined versions and was not taken further.

Fuel
The fuel tanks, as was standard for Italian multi-engined aircraft, were metal self-sealing fuel tanks using materials developed by SEMAPE, the specialized manufacturer. Eight tanks were fitted, with six in the centre wing (4 × 150 L/40 US gallon and 2 × 1,140 L/301 US gal tanks) and two 370 L (100 US gal) tanks (or 780 L/210 US gal with Gnome-Rhône 14K engines) in the outer wings. This gave an overall fuel capacity of 3,620 or 4,400 L (960 or 1,160 US gal).

Operational history

The SM.81 first saw combat during the Second Italo-Abyssinian War, where it showed itself to be versatile serving as a bomber, transport and reconnaissance aircraft. SM.81s also fought in the Spanish Civil War with the Aviazione Legionaria and were among the first aircraft sent by the fascist powers to airlift aid to Francisco Franco.

Despite their obsolescence, by 1940, when Italy became involved in World War II, around 300 (290–304 depending on source) SM.81s were in service with the Regia Aeronautica. The first Italian aircraft to enter action in East Africa were a pair of SM.81s. On 11 June 1940, one of them attacked Port Sudan and the other flew a reconnaissance flight over the Red Sea. That same night, three SM.81s took off to bomb Aden, but one turned back, and one of the other two hit a hill near Massawa while trying to land. A further flight was concurrently deployed against Anglo-Rhodesian defensive positions in British Somaliland immediately before the decisive Battle of Tug Argan, presaging a limited role as a tactical bomber.

Its low speed and vulnerability to fighter aircraft meant that during daytime the SM.81 was restricted to second line duties, finding use as a transport. At night it was an effective bomber, particularly in the North African theatre. Anti-ship actions were also carried out, but without significant success.

Most SM.81s were withdrawn by the time of the Italian armistice of 1943, though some remained in service with both the Italian Social Republic and the Italian Co-Belligerent Air Force.

Several examples survived the war and went on to serve with the Aeronautica Militare Italiana, but by 1950 these had all been retired.

SM.81s serving in Ethiopia had markings applied to distinguish them in SAR missions. The normal camouflage pattern was yellow, green and brown. The all-over dark olive green scheme was introduced later, when the aircraft were used only in transport missions.

Variants
SM.81 Three-engine bomber, transport aircraft, 535 built.
SM.81B Experimental twin-engine prototype, one built.

Operators

Chinese Nationalist Air Force received three aircraft, all were lost in training accidents in February 1938 at Yichang.

Regia Aeronautica
Aviazione Legionaria 64 aircraft 
Italian Co-Belligerent Air Force

Aeronautica Nazionale Repubblicana

Aeronautica Militare Italiana operated this type postwar.

Spanish Air Force

Specifications (Savoia-Marchetti SM.81b with Alfa Romeo 125 R.C.35 engines)

See also

References

Citations

Bibliography

 Angelucci, Enzo and Paolo Matricardi. World Aircraft: World War II, Volume I (Sampson Low Guides). Maidenhead, UK: Sampson Low, 1978. .
 Apostolo, Giorgio. The Savoia Marchetti S.M.81 (Aircraft in Profile number 146). Leatherhead, Surrey, UK: Profile Publications Ltd.,1967.
 Lembo, Daniele, SIAI 81 Pipistrello, Aerei nella Storia, n.33.
 Passingham, Malcolm. "Savoia-Marchetti SM81". Aircraft Illustrated, May 1977, Vol 10 No 5.  pp. 182–187.
 Mondey, David. The Hamlyn Concise Guide to Axis Aircraft of World War II. Chancellor Press, 2002.
 
 Sutherland, Jon & Diane Canwell: Air War East Africa 1940–41 The RAF versus the Italian Air Force. Barnsley (South Yorkshire) Pen and Sword Aviation, 2009. .

SM.081
1930s Italian bomber aircraft
World War II Italian bombers
Trimotors
Low-wing aircraft
Aircraft first flown in 1934